The discography of American musician Bradford Cox includes his work with Deerhunter, the band he cofounded with drummer Moses Archuleta in 2001, and his solo efforts as Atlas Sound.  With Deerhunter, Cox has released four studio albums and two extended plays, and as Atlas Sound he has released two albums, several vinyl singles and splits, and over fifty individual tracks on his blog.  Cox was born in 1982 in Athens, Georgia, and has used the name "Atlas Sound" to refer to his own music since he was a child, when he recorded on a tape player created by the company Atlas Sound.  He is known for having the genetic disorder Marfan syndrome and his live performances with Deerhunter during 2007, in which he would come out on stage in dresses and covered in fake blood.

Cox released his first full-length album as Atlas Sound in 2008, entitled Let the Blind Lead Those Who Can See but Cannot Feel.  In 2009, this was followed by Logos, which leaked onto the Internet two months before its release.  Cox almost ceased production on the record in response, later saying "I did not react well to the leak, in retrospect. It became the kind of internet-fueled drama that I was quickly learning to despise."  Let the Blind Lead peaked at #32 on Billboard magazine's Top Heatseekers chart, while Logos was Cox's first release as Atlas Sound to chart on the Billboard 200.

Deerhunter has a blog hosted by Blogspot on which Cox has been posting free music downloads, including singles, covers, extended plays, mixtapes, and full-length releases since 2007.  He also takes requests for specific songs for him to record from fans.  In an interview with Pitchfork Media, Cox said he is interested in removing possession from his music, as well as not being restrained by the release dates of typical studio albums.  "We have the means to produce something. Why waste our time? And why keep it from the audience, hold it over their heads until it gets to the release date, and have to have them wait until it leaks onto a blog and download a shitty encoded mp3 of it?"  Several tracks from the Deerhunter blog have been sold as vinyl singles.

With Deerhunter

Studio albums:
 Turn It Up Faggot (2005)
 Cryptograms (2007)
 Microcastle/Weird Era Cont. (2008)
 Halcyon Digest (2010)
 Monomania (2013)
 Fading Frontier (2015)
 Why Hasn't Everything Already Disappeared? (2019)

With The Wet Dreams

The short-lived trio included Bradford Cox (drums/vocals), Golden Triangle's Alix Brown (bass/vocals) and Tabitha's Julie Elledge (guitar/vocals).

Extended plays:
 2009 Here Come the Wet Dreams

With Cate Le Bon
Extended plays:
 2019 Myths 004''

As Atlas Sound

Studio albums

Extended plays

European label 4AD has released a bonus disc with each Atlas Sound record.

Singles

Cox has released four songs from his blog on 7-inch vinyl through Audraglint Recordings.

Split albums

Other appearances

Blog music

References

External links
 Deerhunter blog
 [ Atlas Sound] on Allmusic

Discographies of American artists
Electronic music discographies